The St. Mary's Rectory in Sandusky, Ohio was built in 1893.  It was designed and/or built by George Feick.  It was listed on the National Register of Historic Places in 1982.

The rectory stands by the St. Mary's Catholic Church, which was built in 1855 by German immigrants to serve the German community.

The rectory was renovated since 1991.

References

Properties of religious function on the National Register of Historic Places in Ohio
Religious buildings and structures completed in 1893
National Register of Historic Places in Erie County, Ohio
Buildings and structures in Sandusky, Ohio